Xuxa e os Trapalhões em O Mistério de Robin Hood is a 1990 Brazilian comedy-adventure film, directed by José Alvarenga Júnior. The film is starring Xuxa Meneghel and Os Trapalhões.

Plot 
The tramp Didi is a modern Robin Hood who steals from the smugglers and moneylenders to give to the needy. He lives in hiding near a circus, and is in love with Tatiana, the daughter of an old magician. In this circus, Tonho and Fredo are very clumsy employees.

Cast 
Renato Aragão .... Didi
Dedé Santana .... Fredo
Mussum .... Tonho
Xuxa Meneghel .... Tatiana
Carlos Eduardo Dolabella.... Gavião
Márcio Seixas .... Voice Gavião's
Duda Little .... Rosa / Luisa Cavalcante Rocha
Roberto Guilherme .... circus guard
Átila Iório .... circus owner
Nildo Parente .... Father Rosa's
Juan Daniel .... Sebastian, the dad Tatiana's
Tião Macalé .... Himself
Beto Carrero .... Himself
Amadeu Celestino

Critical reception 
Conrado Heoli in his criticism for the website Papo de Cinema, said that the film "demonstrates the fatigue of the group [The Trapalhões] and the difficulty in remaining relevant and inventive, after more than three decades dedicated to humor. artistic in costumes, scenarios and even in its plot, the film ends up as an extended episode of the television humorous series, recycling gags that have already been seen, without much inspiration ... [It has] as many mistakes as the correct ones."

See also 
 List of Brazilian films of the 1990s

References

External links 
 

Os Trapalhões
Brazilian adventure films
Brazilian children's films
1990 films
Brazilian romantic comedy films
Robin Hood films
Robin Hood parodies
1990s musical comedy films
1990 comedy films
1990s Portuguese-language films